The Express UU Bar Ranch, formerly owned by the Oklahoma oil magnate Waite Phillips and now owned by Express Ranches (headquartered in Yukon, Oklahoma), is west of Cimarron, New Mexico, USA, and south of Philmont Scout Ranch. The two ranches are separated by Highway 21. Express Ranches is controlled by Robert A. "Bob" Funk, who is chairman, CEO and founder of Express Employment Professionals.

The original UU Bar Ranch land was purchased by Phillips in the 1920s and totaled over 300,000 acres.  When Phillips donated his UU Bar Ranch land north of what is now Highway 21 to the Boy Scouts of America in 1941 (approximately 127,000 acres) and retained the grazing land to the south. Without the use of the Villa Philmonte, Phillips briefly moved the UU Bar Ranch headquarters to the historic Casa del Gavilan near the base of Urraca Mesa, selling the ranch in 1943 to a family with the last name of McDaniel.

The Express UU Bar Ranch has cattle and tourism (hunting and fishing) operations and comprises approximately 160,000 acres. The ranch also owns the historic St. James Hotel in nearby Cimarron, which it purchased in January 2009.

Website

http://www.expressuubar.com/

References

Buildings and structures in Colfax County, New Mexico
Ranches in New Mexico